City Deals are an initiative enacted by the UK government in 2012 to promote economic growth and infrastructure while ultimately shifting control of decisions away from the central government to local authorities. City Deals are generally set for ten year plans and have been enacted across several cities within the United Kingdom.

In 2016 the Cities and Local Government Devolution Act was enacted to give a firmer statutory footing for City Deals in England and Wales.  The Act provided for a more open and transparent process for deals, including public consultation before implementation.  The Act provided for devolution deals between the government and any local authority or group of contiguous local authorities.

In March 2017, the Australian Government announced it would begin modeling City Deals after UK models.

References

2012 establishments in the United Kingdom
Economic policy in Europe
Local government in the United Kingdom
Devolution in the United Kingdom